The Choctaw County School District is a public school district based in Ackerman, Mississippi (USA). The district's boundaries parallel that of Choctaw County.

Schools

Choctaw County High School (Choctaw County, Grades 7-12)
Choctaw County Elementary School (Choctaw County, Grades PK-6)
French Camp Elementary School (French Camp, Grades PK-8)
Children at the French Camp Academy in grades Kindergarten through 8 attend French Camp Elementary School.
Weir Attendance Center (Weir, Grades PK-12)
French Camp Academy students in grades 7 through 8 may attend the school's technology preparatory program. 7th grade students may take career discovery courses, and 8th grade students may take computer discovery courses.

Failing schools
Statewide testing ranks the schools in Mississippi. Those in the bottom six percent are listed as "failing." As of early 2018, Choctaw County High School was included in this category.

Demographics

2006-07 school year
There were a total of 1,712 students enrolled in the Choctaw County School District during the 2006–2007 school year. The gender makeup of the district was 49% female and 51% male. The racial makeup of the district was 36.80% African American, 62.15% White, 0.58% Hispanic, 0.29% Asian, and 0.18% Native American. 54.9% of the district's students were eligible to receive free lunch.

Previous school years

Accountability statistics

See also

List of school districts in Mississippi

References

External links

Education in Choctaw County, Mississippi
School districts in Mississippi